"Idle Chatter" is a popular song written by Al Sherman and recorded by the Andrews Sisters with the Nelson Riddle Orchestra.  The music is adapted from the popular 19th-century ballet, Dance of the Hours by Ponchielli.  The song was recorded on May 26, 1952, and released later that year.

References

Songs written by Al Sherman
1952 songs
Decca Records singles
The Andrews Sisters songs